Bracebridge is an undefined area of Worksop in Nottinghamshire, lying between Manton to the south, and Kilton to the north, lying on the Chesterfield Canal and the riverRyton, close to a point where the river is crossed-over by the canal. The area takes its name from the Georgian Bridge, which crosses the canal, which was achieved by "bracing" the stonework with iron, achieving a wide single-span. Immediately around this bridge is the core of old Bracebridge, which was created to serve the canal, and is the site of a lock. The bridge is the original route of the B6041, before a new road was built some 200 yards East, to avoid congestion, on the narrow Bracebridge. This original stretch of road is now a cul-de-sac, having been bollarded at the south end close to the bridge over the Ryton.

To the west of old Bracebridge, further along the Chesterfield Canal, most of Bracebridge consists of modern housing. However, much of the surrounding area around consists of open wasteland and farmland left behind by the building of the new B6041 road, and the industrial buildings of Manton.
Lying east of the new B6041 is a former pumping station, built of brick, in a pseudo French Baroque style complete with sloping roof.

Populated places in Nottinghamshire
Bassetlaw District
Worksop